Shigeharu Aoyama is a Japanese politician who has served as a member of the House of Councillors of Japan, since 2016. He represents the National proportional representation block. He currently serves on the following committees:

 Committee on Economy and Industry (Director)

 Committee on Budget

 Special Committee on Official Development Assistance and Related Matters (Director)

Early life 
Aoyama was born on July 25, 1952 in the Hyogo Prefecture of Japan. He graduated from the School of Political Science and Economics of Waseda University in 1979.

Career 
Prior to his election to the House of Councillors, Aoyama worked as a journalist and founded a think tank. A summary of his career is below:

 1979-98: Worked as a journalist for Kyodo News.
 1998-2002: Researcher for Mitsubishi Research Institute (think tank).
 2002: Founded "Japan's Independent Institute", a think tank (separated from Mitsubishi).

In 2016, he was elected to the House of Councillors.

References 

Members of the House of Councillors (Japan)
1952 births
Living people